Maximilian Mordhorst (born 10 April 1996) is a German politician from the Free Democratic Party. Since 2021, he has been a Member of the Bundestag from Schleswig-Holstein.

Early life 
He was born in Neumünster. He studied law at the University of Kiel.

Political career 
At the 2021 federal election he stood in the constituency of Kiel but came in fourth place. He was elected on the state list.

References 

Living people
1996 births
People from Neumünster
Members of the Bundestag for Schleswig-Holstein
Members of the Bundestag 2021–2025
Members of the Bundestag for the Free Democratic Party (Germany)
21st-century German politicians
University of Kiel alumni